tRNA pseudouridine13 synthase (TruD, YgbO, tRNA PSI13 synthase, RNA:PSI-synthase Pus7p, Pus7p, RNA:pseudouridine-synthase Pus7p, Pus7 protein) is an enzyme with systematic name tRNA-uridine13 uracil mutase. This enzyme catalyses the following chemical reaction

 tRNA uridine13  tRNA pseudouridine13

Pseudouridine synthase TruD from Escherichia coli specifically acts on uridine13 in tRNA.

References

External links 
 

EC 5.4.99